Salomon de Brosse (c. 1571 – 8 December 1626) was an early 17th-century French architect who moved away from late Mannerism to reassert the French classical style and was a major influence on François Mansart.

Life
Salomon was born in Verneuil-en-Halatte, Oise, into a prominent Huguenot family, the grandson through his mother of the designer Jacques I Androuet du Cerceau and the son of the architect Jean de Brosse. He was established in practice in Paris in 1598 and was promoted to court architect in 1608.

De Brosse died, aged 55, in Paris.

Luxembourg Palace
De Brosse greatly influenced the sober and classicizing direction that  French Baroque architecture was to take, especially in designing his most prominent commission, the Luxembourg Palace, Paris (1615-1624), for Marie de' Medici, whose patronage had been extended to his uncle. Salomon de Brosse simplified the crowded compositions of his Androuet du Cerceau heritage and contemporary practice, ranging the U-shaped block round an entrance court, as Carlo Maderno was doing at Palazzo Barberini, Rome, about the same time. The impetus for the plan is often traced to Palazzo Pitti, Florence, where the Medici queen had spent her youth, but the formal plan of Anet could also be adduced. He clad the building wholly in stone, avoiding the lively contrast of brick and stone that was the more familiar idiom. Though de Brosse was forced to relinquish his post on 24 March 1624, construction of the Luxembourg proceeded according to his plan and elevations; extensions made in the nineteenth century have not obscured his external elements.

List of works
 Completion (1608 – c. 1615) of the Château de Montceaux-en-Brie
 Château of Coulommiers-en-Brie (1612–15), for Catherine Gonzaga, duchesse de Longueville.
 Facade of the Church of Saint-Gervais, Paris (1615–1621)
 Luxembourg Palace, Paris (1615–1624)
 Parlement de Bretagne, Rennes (1618) (now )
 Aqueduct of Arcueil (1624)
 Designs (1611/1612) for the Château of Blérancourt (completed c. 1619)

Gallery

Notes

Bibliography
 Ayers, Andrew (2004). The Architecture of Paris. Stuttgart; London: Edition Axel Menges. .
 Blondel, Jacques-François (1752). Architecture françoise, reimpression of 1904, vol. 2. Paris: Librairie centrale des Beaux-Arts.
 Coope, Rosalys (1972). Salomon de Brosse and the Development of the Classical Style in French Architecture from 1565 to 1630. London: A. Zwemmer. . University Park: The Pennsylvania State University Press. 
 Coope, Rosalys (1996). "Brosse, Solomon de" in The Dictionary of Art, edited by Jane Turner, reprinted with minor corrections in 1998, vol. 4, pp. 864–866. London: Macmillan. .

External links
 
 Pannier, Jacques (1911). Un architecte français au commencement du XVIIe siècle: Salomon de Brosse. Paris: Libraire centrale d'Art et d'Architecture. View at Internet Archive.

1571 births
1626 deaths
Renaissance architects
16th-century French architects
17th-century French architects
Huguenots
Calvinist and Reformed artists
French Baroque architects